Pool B of the 2014 Fed Cup Asia/Oceania Group I was one of two pools in the Asia/Oceania Group I of the 2014 Fed Cup. Three teams competed in a round robin competition, with the top team and the bottom two teams proceeding to their respective sections of the play-offs: the top team played for advancement to the World Group II Play-offs, while the bottom team faced potential relegation to Group II.

Standings

Round-robin

China vs. Uzbekistan

South Korea vs. Chinese Taipei

China vs. South Korea

Uzbekistan vs. Chinese Taipei

China vs. Chinese Taipei

Uzbekistan vs. South Korea

References

External links 
 Fed Cup website

B1